This is a record of Argentina's results at the FIFA World Cup. Argentina is one of the most successful teams in the tournament's history, having won three World Cups: in 1978, 1986, 2022. Argentina has also been runner up three times: in 1930, 1990 and 2014. In 18 World Cup tournaments, Argentina has 47 victories in 88 matches. The team was present in all but four of the World Cups, being behind only Brazil and Germany in number of appearances.

World Cup record

**Gold background color indicates that the tournament was won. Red border color indicates tournament was held on home soil.

World Cup Finals

All matches

World Cup Finals

1930 v Uruguay

The inaugural FIFA World Cup tournament culminated with Argentina facing hosts and current Olympic champions Uruguay. The match was turned twice: Argentina went into half-time with a 2–1 lead in spite of an early goal for Uruguay, but the hosts ultimately won 4–2. Guillermo Stábile, one of Argentina's scorers, became the tournament's top striker with 8 goals total.

1978 v the Netherlands

Argentina hosted the 1978 edition of the World Cup and reached the final. The Netherlands had already played the previous final in West Germany 1974 - and also lost to the hosts.

Diego Maradona was 17 years old at this point and already a star in his home country, but did not make the squad as coach César Luis Menotti felt he was too inexperienced to handle the pressure of this major tournament. The playmaker position was instead filled by Mario Kempes, who ended up becoming the first Argentinian to win the Golden Ball in addition to being the tournament's top scorer with 6 goals.

The Dutch side was missing a superstar of their own: Johan Cruyff did not join the 1978 World Cup squads due to the aftermath of a kidnapping attempt which occurred in 1977. He only disclosed this information 30 years later.

The closely contested match was influenced by a hostile atmosphere and ended with the Dutch players refusing to attend the award ceremony after Argentina grabbed the title in extra time.

1986 v West Germany

Eight years after the victory on home soil, Argentina won the World Cup title for the second time. Diego Maradona was voted Best Player of the tournament after scoring five goals and assisting the decisive 3-2 by Jorge Burruchaga in the 84th minute of the final. The match was played in front of a record attendance of 114,600 people.

1990 v West Germany

In 1990, Argentina faced West Germany in a repeat of the 1986 edition. Pedro Monzón became the first player ever to be sent off in a World Cup final, but was later joined by teammate Gustavo Dezotti. The match was decided by a penalty kick in favour of Germany.

2014 v Germany

In 2014, Argentina reached the final for the fifth time and for a third time had to face the German team, making it the most recurrent meeting for a final. In spite of a number of chances on both sides, regular time finished goalless. In the second half of extra time, substitute striker Mario Götze scored the decisive goal for Germany.

2022 v France
Argentina opened up the scoring when Messi scored a penalty kick, and doubled their lead with a Di Maria goal in the 36th minute. France made two substitutions in the first half, but went into half-time trailing 0–2. Despite not having a shot until after the 80th minute, France were awarded a penalty as Randal Kolo Muani was brought down in the penalty area. Mbappé scored the penalty, and added a second goal less than two minutes later to equalise the scores. With the scores tied, the match went to extra time. Messi scored again for Argentina in the second extra time half. Mbappé was awarded a second penalty in the 118th minute after his initial shot hit the arm of Gonzalo Montiel. Mbappé scored his third goal, becoming the second player to score a hat-trick in the final of a World Cup. With the scores tied at 3–3, the match was completed by a penalty shootout. Argentina won the final after scoring all of their penalties, winning 4–2.

Record by opponent 
Argentina have played a total of 88 FIFA World Cup games through 18 tournaments, facing 39 rivals.

Teams in bold denote world cup winners, teams in italics show teams which played its first match ever in a World Cup against Argentina.
Teams with a * mark no longer exist. East Germany was annexed to Germany. Soviet Union now plays as Russia.
+Played as Yugoslavia and Serbia and Montenegro.

Head coaches
Through Argentinian team history, several coaches had trained it with different football styles from offensive to defensive tactics. There are two predominant 'football schools' about world champions coaches César Menotti who propagates possession and well-look play and Carlos Bilardo who prioritize results and tactical order. These head coaches divides Argentine fans kindly. Other managers such as Marcelo Bielsa has got his own football style. In another way this list shows records in World Cups and in qualifying stages excluding friendlies.

From 1994 towards, three points are given for a win. Previously were two.

Against conferences
FIFA delegates regional qualification and other organization affairs to continental conferences, so it divides into six differents of them grouped by geographical location. Argentina plays in CONMEBOL conference in South America. Due to World Cup rules that two teams of same confederation can not play in the same group in first round except for UEFA, it commonly faces teams which plays outside its continent most recently from Africa and Asia. Argentine national has never played versus an Oceanian (OFC) squad.

Against debutants 
'Albiceleste' has played against first-world-cup teams more than other, doing so 17 times, 7 of them being the first World Cup match ever. This list shows records versus those selections including all-debutants 1930 edition. Curiously, Argentina's debut was versus France which previously had played before.

Sweden, Bulgaria, Greece, Japan, Ivory Coast, Bosnia and Herzegovina and Iceland played its first time against Argentina.France, Mexico, Chile, United States, Uruguay, Northern Ireland, Haiti, East Germany, Jamaica and Croatia played in its first world cup but after first game.

Records and statistics

Most appearances 
Diego Maradona has captained the team in 16 matches.
Lionel Messi's total of 26 matches is a record for the side and the most for a player at the FIFA World Cup.

Top goalscorers

Goalscoring by tournament

Awards

Team

 World Champions 1978
 World Champions 1986
 World Champions 2022
 2nd Place 1930
 2nd Place 1990
 2nd Place 2014
 Fair Play Award 1978

Individual

 Golden Ball 1978: Mario Kempes
 Golden Ball 1986: Diego Maradona
 Golden Ball 2014: Lionel Messi
 Golden Ball 2022: Lionel Messi
 Silver Ball 1930: Guillermo Stábile
 Bronze Ball 1990: Diego Maradona

 Golden Boot 1930: Guillermo Stábile
 Golden Boot 1978: Mario Kempes
 Silver Boot 1986: Diego Maradona
 Silver Boot 1998: Gabriel Batistuta
 Silver Boot 2006: Hernán Crespo
 Silver Boot 2022: Lionel Messi

 Golden Glove 1978: Ubaldo Fillol
 Golden Glove 1990: Sergio Goycochea (shared with Luis Gabelo Conejo)
 Golden Glove 2022: Emiliano Martínez
 Best Young Player 2022: Enzo Fernández
 Most Player of the Match Awards 2014 (4) and 2022 (5): Lionel Messi
 Most Player of the Match Awards over various World Cups by a single player (11): Lionel Messi

 José Pékerman won the FIFA Fair Play Trophy as a coach with Colombia in 2014.

Standing alone 

 Most played final against the same team: 3 times versus Germany in 1986, 1990 and 2014.
 Most played against the same team in same stage: 5 times versus Nigeria in 1994, 2002, 2010, 2014 and 2018 all in group stage. Last three of them make most times consecutive, too. All won by Argentina by one goal difference.
 Most played semifinals without losses: 5 times won in 1930 and 1986 while drawn in 1990 and 2014. Although in 1978 there weren't semifinals, Argentina won second round group ahead of Brazil which disputed 3rd place match against Italy. Even more, game against Brazil ended in a 0–0 draw.
 Most played penalty shoot-outs: 7 (twice in 1990, 1998, 2006, 2014 and twice in 2022).
 Fewest goals for a finalist: 1990 (5).
 Youngest coach: Juan José Tramutola aged 27 years and 267 days in 1930.
 Most hat-tricks scored in multiple editions: Gabriel Batistuta in 1994 against Greece and in 1998 against Jamaica.

Shared

 Most played against the same team: 7 times versus Germany in 1958, 1966, 1986, 1990, 2006, 2010 and 2014. Shared with Germany vs Yugoslavia/Serbia and Brazil vs Sweden.
 Most won penalty shoot-outs: 6 times (twice in 1990, 1998, 2014 and twice in 2022).
 Most coached finals: 2 times by Carlos Bilardo in 1986 and 1990. Shared with Italian Vittorio Pozzo (1934-1938), German Helmut Schön (1966-1974), Brazilian Mário Zagallo (1970-1998) German Franz Beckenbauer who faced Bilardo in both two in 1986 and 1990, and French Didier Deschamps (2018-2022).

Miscellaneous
Argentina's game versus West Germany in 1958 featured a yellow jersey instead of the traditional light blue and white colors or blue as alternate. This was because both teams wore white jerseys, creating confusion. As the South American side forgot to bring an alternate one, they decided to borrow jerseys from local team club Malmö. Germany won 3–1.

In the 1978 France - Hungary match something similar occurred. Both teams arrived to the match with white jerseys, so France was forced to borrow jerseys from Mar del Plata's local club Kimberley. France wore striped green and white keeping the traditional blue shorts and red socks. France won 3–1.

Including France vs. Hungary, several matches of the 1978 World Cup were played in this stadium. Mar del Plata is in the south of Buenos Aires Province.

In addition, Argentina played against Nigeria at Krestovsky Stadium, Saint Petersburg in 2018 making it the northernmost game along other six matches.

Referees

As a major CONMEBOL member, Argentina has been represented by match officials in nearly every tournament. In 2006, Horacio Elizondo refereed the final between France and Italy, where he sent off Zinedine Zidane after a headbutt to an opponent. In 2018, Néstor Pitana did it when France played versus Croatia. They are also the only two who refereed the opening game in the same tournament.

External links 
 Official website, at the Asociación del Fútbol Argentino's website
 FIFA world cup all-time table

Notes

References

 
World Cup
Countries at the FIFA World Cup